The Donde Stars are an indie rock band based in Cardiff, Wales. They consist of Luke Williams (vocals/guitar), Mathew Acreman (bass/backing vocals), Tyler Rhys (lead guitar/keyboards/vocals) and Steven Rodd (drums). Since their formation in 2003 in the Rhondda Valley, South Wales, the band have cemented a loyal local following and are renowned for their powerful and energetic live shows.

Background
The founding members, Luke Williams and Mathew Acreman were originally joined by drummer Mike Thompson and later by guitarist/keyboardist Matthew Harris. They gained popularity in south Wales following the release of their debut single, You Can Keep The Kids/Pianissimo in 2007. The band received positive reviews and were described as "…one of the best unsigned bands in the UK" (Claire Sturgess – XFM). They played well-received sets at the Edinburgh Festival Fringe and the Metro Weekender Cardiff in 2007, as well as receiving radio-play from BBC Wales and XFM, including a session for Adam Walton.
Mike Thompson and Matthew Harris left the band in 2008 due to other commitments and so the band brought in local solo artist and film school graduate Tyler Rhys on guitar, and sound technician Steven Rodd on drums. Since the introduction of these new members the band has gone from strength to strength, with the song Bringer of the Dark being featured on BBC Introducing with Tom Robinson. 
The band since then have had a new drummer on board in the name of Guy Martinez. Guy had been frequenting the famous Rockfield studios in Monmouth as a session drummer for numerous bands and joined the rest of the band for their first official gig, which took place in Domodossola in Italy in January 2010 and the band gaining more high-profile shows including upcoming appearances at Square Festival, Aberystwyth and headline shows in Italy.

The band
The Donde Stars play grand and emotionally charged rock music which is notable for William's soaring and powerful vocals, Rhys' intricate lead guitar and the tight and heavy rhythm section of Harris and Rodd. Williams has until recently been the principal songwriter, and has written all the songs on the anticipated upcoming debut album. Tyler Rhys is also a songwriter, having previously released low-profile solo recordings, and the two have begun writing together for the band's second album. The band are fortunate in that the make up of the band, of two principal songwriters and two sound technicians, means that developing music can be done entirely in-house in a self-contained unit. Both Tyler Rhys and Guy Martinez are multi-instrumentalists and have been known to switch instruments for encores at shows. Bassist Harris owns his own practice and recording studio that the band have always at their disposal, and it will be re-decorated and used to demo their second album early next year.

Releases
The Donde Stars released their first single, the double A-side, "You Can Keep The Kids/Pianissimo" on Reacharound Records in March 2007. It was recorded by Tim Lewis (formerly of Spiritualized) who has since been working with the band on their debut album, set for self-release on Antic Records in late 2009. Farewell, Tragic Lightning Boy is the proposed title of the album, which has been funded by the band and painstakingly put together over weekend trips to  studios in Carmenthenshire.

America will be the lead single off the album and will be available digitally. It was the first song to be recorded by the current line-up of the band and shows the intricate instrumentation the new members bring.

Discography

Albums
Farewell, Tragic Lightning Boy (October 2009, Antic Records)

Singles
"You Can Keep The Kids" / "Pianissimo" (March 2007, Reacharound Records)
"America" (August 2009, Antic Records)

References

External links
 Myspace
 Official website
 Twitter
 Antic Records Myspace

Welsh rock music groups